Baroness Marion Lambert (1943 – 28 May 2016) was a Swiss art collector, and the wife of Baron Philippe Lambert of the Bank Brussels Lambert banking dynasty. She was described as "one of the first collectors and patrons of contemporary photography".

Early life
Marion Lambert was born Marion de Vries in 1943, into a prominent Swiss family of Dutch descent. She was raised in Geneva.

Art collector
Lambert has been called "one of the first collectors and patrons of contemporary photography".

In a November 2004, she sold her entire collection of about 300 photographs mostly from the 1980s, entitled Veronica's Revenge, at Phillips de Pury in Chelsea, New York for a total of $9.2 million. Her original intention was for the collection to hang in the new headquarters of Bank Brussels Lambert in Geneva, but the directors found the works "simply too shocking". New records were set for works by Barbara Kruger, Charles Ray, Cindy Sherman, Mike Kelley, Richard Prince, and Louise Lawler.

From 3 to 14 October 2015, 306 objects from the Lambert Art Collection with estimates from £20 up to £3 million  were on show at Ely House in Dover Street, and then auctioned by Christie's on 14 October 2015. Lambert and many of the objects in the auction appear in episode two of The Extraordinary Collector, presented by Gordon Watson.

Personal life
In 1975, Marion married Baron Philippe Lambert, and they had two children together, a son, Henri Lambert, and Philippine Lambert, who died by suicide aged 20. Her suicide note and diaries accused a prominent family friend of sexual abuse.

The Lamberts lived in Geneva, Switzerland, and owned an 18th-century Florentine-style villa, the Palazzo Terranova, in Umbria.

Death
On 24 May 2016, she was hit by a bus on route 73 near Bond Street tube station in London. She died from head injuries on 28 May 2016.

References

External links
Lambert Art Collection, 2015 sale

1943 births
2016 deaths
Swiss art collectors
Women art collectors
Curators from Geneva
Pedestrian road incident deaths
Road incident deaths in London